Yan Cheng Law (born 24 December 1992) is an Indian professional football coach.

Career

At the age of 18, while playing for George Telegraph in the Calcutta league, Law was forced to take the D coaching License course by Joydeep Mukherjee, one of the George Telegraph officials, who saw potential in him to become a coach. Despite being made fun of by older men at the course, he eventually obtained the license. However, upon returning to George Telegraph, he was excluded from the team, so turned to coaching full-time with the help of his father.

Calcutta United Club 
Law was appointed head coach of Calcutta United Club in the lowest division of Calcutta at the age of 20 through owner Joydeep Mukherjee, who forced him to take his first courses.

By age 26, Law had obtained the AFC A License, the youngest coach to do so.

Minerva Punjab 
In 2019, Law was appointed head coach of Minerva Punjab FC in the I-League after impressing owner Ranjit Bajaj while Head of Youth Development at Mohammedan.

Mohammed SC 
On 31 July 2020, Yan Law was  appointed as the head coach of Mohammedan SC. On 11 October 2020 , he parted ways with Mohammedan SC.

Techtro Swades United 
On 14 November 2020, Yan Law was appointed as the head coach of Techtro Swades United FC. He led the club to runners-up spot in their maiden tournament of Himachal Football League.

Biratnagar City FC

On 1 April 2021, Yan Law was appointed as the head coach of Biratnagar City FC. He led the club to sixth spot in their maiden tournament of Nepal Super League.

Aizawl FC

On 19 January 2021, Law moved to Aizawl as manager. Under his guidance, the team achieved eighth place in 2021–22 I-League season. He parted ways with Aizawl in June 2022.

Druk Lhayul FC
In June 2022, Law was appointed as new head coach of Bhutan Premier League club Druk Lhayul FC.

Controversy
The Mohammedan SC sacked Yan for allegedly leaking team information. They dismissed him mid-way in the 2020–21 I-League.

Personal life

Law is of Chinese heritage. His family previously owned Kim Wah, a Chinese restaurant that was well known in the 1970s and 1980s.

References

External links

Indian footballers
Indian football managers
Living people
Indian people of Chinese descent
1992 births
People from Gangtok
Footballers from Sikkim
Aizawl FC managers
Mohammedan SC (Kolkata) managers
RoundGlass Punjab FC managers
Association footballers not categorized by position
Expatriate football managers in Nepal
Indian expatriate football managers